The Socialist League of Palestine was a political organization in Mandate Palestine. Established in 1936, it was connected to the left-Zionist Hashomer Hatzair movement. The Socialist League functioned as the urban ally of the Kibbutz Artzi movement. In 1946, the Socialist League and Kibbutz Artzi movement founded the Hashomer Hatzair Workers Party (one of the fore-runners of MAPAM, itself a forerunner of Meretz in turn).

References

Political parties in Mandatory Palestine
Political parties established in 1936
Political parties disestablished in 1946
Socialist parties in Asia
1936 establishments in Mandatory Palestine
1946 disestablishments in Mandatory Palestine
Hashomer Hatzair
Labor Zionism
Zionist political parties in Israel